ATPase inhibitor, mitochondrial is an enzyme that in humans is encoded by the ATPIF1 gene.

This gene encodes a mitochondrial ATPase inhibitor. Alternative splicing occurs at this locus and three transcript variants encoding distinct isoforms have been identified.

It prevents ATPase from switching to ATP hydrolysis during collapse of the electrochemical gradient, for example during oxygen deprivation  ATP synthase inhibitor forms a one-to-one complex with the F1 ATPase, possibly by binding at the alpha-beta interface. It is thought to inhibit ATP synthesis by preventing the release of ATP. The inhibitor has two oligomeric states, dimer (the active state) and tetramer. At low pH, the inhibitor forms a dimer via antiparallel coiled coil interactions between the C-terminal regions of two monomers. At high pH, the inhibitor forms tetramers and higher oligomers by coiled coil interactions involving the N terminus and inhibitory region, thus preventing the inhibitory activity.

Model organisms

Model organisms have been used in the study of ATPIF1 function. A conditional knockout mouse line, called Atpif1tm1a(EUCOMM)Wtsi was generated as part of the International Knockout Mouse Consortium program — a high-throughput mutagenesis project to generate and distribute animal models of disease to interested scientists.

Male and female animals underwent a standardized phenotypic screen to determine the effects of deletion. Twenty three tests were carried out on mutant mice and three significant abnormalities were observed. Homozygous mutant animals displayed hyperactivity and brain dysmorphology, while males also had decreased circulating alkaline phosphatase levels.

References

External links

Further reading

Protein families
Genes mutated in mice